Nunn is a Statutory Town in Weld County, Colorado, United States. The population was 416 at the 2010 census.

A post office called Nunn has been in operation since 1905. The town was named after Tom Nunn, who was credited with preventing a nearby train wreck.

Geography

Demographics

As of the census of 2000, there were 471 people, 158 households, and 118 families residing in the town. The racial makeup of the town was 78.98% White, 0.42% African American, 1.91% Native American, 0.21% Asian, 14.86% from other races, and 3.61% from two or more races. Hispanic or Latino of any race were 24.84% of the population.

There were 158 households, out of which 38.6% had children under the age of 18 living with them, 62.7% were married couples living together, 7.6% had a female householder with no husband present, and 24.7% were non-families. 22.8% of all households were made up of individuals, and 8.9% had someone living alone who was 65 years of age or older. The average household size was 2.98 and the average family size was 3.50.

In the town, the population was spread out, with 33.5% under the age of 18, 7.4% from 18 to 24, 31.0% from 25 to 44, 16.3% from 45 to 64, and 11.7% who were 65 years of age or older. The median age was 31 years. For every 100 females, there were 101.3 males. For every 100 females age 18 and over, there were 96.9 males.

The median income for a household in the town was $35,714, and the median income for a family was $40,357. Males had a median income of $27,292 versus $21,875 for females. The per capita income for the town was $14,769. About 17.2% of families and 19.0% of the population were below the poverty line, including 24.8% of those under age 18 and 9.4% of those age 65 or over.

Economy

Nunn is the home of Greenfaith Ministry, the nation's first cannabis sacrament church and charity.

About a third of the town's budget is generated by citations  written by its police department.

See also

Outline of Colorado
Index of Colorado-related articles
State of Colorado
Colorado cities and towns
Colorado municipalities
Colorado counties
Weld County, Colorado
Colorado metropolitan areas
Front Range Urban Corridor
North Central Colorado Urban Area
Denver-Aurora-Boulder, CO Combined Statistical Area
Greeley, CO Metropolitan Statistical Area
in-situ leaching
open-pit mining
uranium mining
uranium mining in Colorado

References

External links
 Town of Nunn contacts
 CDOT map of the Town of Nunn

Towns in Weld County, Colorado
Towns in Colorado